Hanscarl Leuner (b. 1919 in Bautzen - d. 1996 in Göttingen) was a German  psychiatrist and researcher.

His father was a leatherware factory owner. His study of medicine at Frankfurt University and Marburg University (1939–1946) was interrupted by his military service in World War II.

He was a pioneer in using psychoactive drugs for therapy in Germany. He created a system known as "Psycholytic Therapy", a combination of psychotherapy with hallucinogens with the intent of analyzing the subcouncious mind. He also developed Guided Affective Imagery

Bibliography (selected works) 
 Die experimentelle Psychose. Ihre Psychopharmakologie, Phänomenologie und Dynamik in Beziehung zur Person. (Eng: The Experimental Psychoses: The psychopharmacology, phenomenology and dynamic in relation to the individual.) Springer, Berlin 1962, . Reprint 1997: Berlin VWB. 
 Katathymes Bilderleben: Unterstufe. Einführung in die Psychotherapie mit der Tagtraumtechnik. Ein Seminar. Thieme, Stuttgart 1970; 5. Auflage: Katathym-imaginative Psychotherapie (K.I.P.): „Katathymes Bilderleben“. Einführung in die Psychotherapie mit der Tagtraumtechnik. Ein Seminar. Thieme, Stuttgart 1994.
 Halluzinogene: Psychische Grenzzustände in Forschung und Psychotherapie. (Eng: "Hallucinogens: Psychiatric Limitations on Research and Psychotherapy") Huber, Bern 1981, .
 Lehrbuch des Katathymen Bilderlebens. Huber, Bern 1985; 3. Auflage: Lehrbuch der Katathym-imaginativen Psychotherapie. Huber, Bern 1994, .
 Ce qu’on n’a pas expliqué en France, Planète, n°33, mars-avril 1967, pp. 92–101

External links 
 
 Erowid Character Vaults - Hanscarl Leuner

1919 births
1996 deaths
People from Bautzen
German psychiatrists
20th-century German physicians